Samved is a Mumbai (India) based Folk Fusion/Electronica band. Samved was formed in early 2013 by electronic artists and music producers Ritvik Joe and KK along with friends and performing musicians Zeeshan Khan, Sangeet Mishra and Kirti Das. Samved is signed under Universal Music Group since the year 2014. The same year, in 2014, Samved released their first studio album RlungTa. Samved is among the few bands in the country to use Sarangi as a lead instrument in their music.

Members

 Ritvik Joe - Music Producer, Electronic Artist, Guitars
 Abhijeet Hegdepatil - Music Producer, Electronic Artist, Pianist
 Zeeshan Khan – Vocalist
 Sangeet Mishra – Sarangi
 Kirti Das – Percussions

Featuring Artists on Acoustic Sets

 Harish Sagane – Guitars
 Gautam Sharma – Percussions

Collaborations
In 2014 Samved collaborated with Christie Bourcq, a French artist for their studio album Rlung Ta. Tracks performed by Christie Bourcq include Infinite Days and Gyrating Solang. 
In 2015 the band collaborated with Imran Khan, a renowned sitar player from Sikar Gharana and Shruti Prakash for their single Moore Nain, released by Universal Music Group.

Kama Unit
 
Samved released their first single Kama Unit under the label Universal Music Group in early 2014. The video for the song was first of its kind in the world. The director of the video, Shekhar Karalkar, combined light painting and stop motion for the first time for a music video. The video was well received and earned the band recognition in the Indie Music space.

Music Style

Samved's musical style is Electro Classical Fusion. Their music is a blend of Upbeat Industrial Electronica and Hindustani Classical. The band draws its inspiration from fusion acts like Anand Shankar and Talvin Singh. The band's name "Samved" is inspired for one of the four Vedas Samaveda. Samaveda is the Veda of Melodies and Sounds. The Indian Classical music and dance considers the melodies in Samaveda as one of its roots. Their logo is an ancient Indus valley dancing and performing arts symbol.

Awards and nominations

Discography
Album
  RlungTa (2014)

Singles
 Kama Unit (2014)
 Moore Nain feat. Imran Khan & Shruti (2015)
 Raat Bhar (Acoustic) (2016)
 Meera (2017)

References

Indian musical groups
Musical groups established in 2013
2013 establishments in Maharashtra

https://www.bollywoodmdb.com/celebrities/filmography/abhijeet-hegde-patil/26823